Flutterwave is a Nigerian fintech company that provides a payment infrastructure for global merchants and payment service providers across the continent.

History 
The company was founded in 2016 by Iyinoluwa Aboyeji, Olugbenga Agboola, and Adeleke Adekoya and is headquartered in San Francisco, California with operations in Nigeria, Kenya, Ghana, South Africa , and seven other African countries.

In 2021, Flutterwave raised a US$170 million Series C funding round. At the time, this was the largest amount ever secured by an African tech startup and gave it a valuation of over US$1 billion, making Flutterwave a unicorn. Investors in Flutterwave include Y-Combinator, Visa Ventures, Mastercard,  Avenir Growth Capital, and Tiger Global Management. Also in 2022, Flutterwave raised a US$250 million Series D funding round  at over US$3 billion valuation.

In December 2021, Flutterwave launched Send, an African-focused remittances service, and immediately appointed Nigerian Grammy Award-winning international musician, Ayodeji Ibrahim Balogun, popularly known as Wizkid as its global ambassador to further push the company's brand among the Africans in the diaspora.

In January 2022, Flutterwave partnered AfroSport Network to broadcast the 2021 Africa Cup of Nations free-to-air from 9 January 2022 to 6 February 2022.

Digital Store
At the peak of the COVID-19 pandemic, Flutterwave built a digital store to help medium and small-scale businesses that were badly impacted by the global lockdown to display their products for market online. The store became a turnaround for these businesses that are mainly without digital footprints or without the means to integrate payment into their webpage. Over 20,000 businesses enrolled on the store for free through a campaign called "keeping the lights on".

Switching License
On September 1, 2022, Bloomberg reported that the Central Bank of Nigeria had granted Flutterwave the country's highest payment processing license, which allows it to process transactions between banks and cards without intermediaries. The switching processing license grants Flutterwave autonomy across the payments ecosystem value chain. This includes processing funds transfers between banks and fintechs, as well as participating in agency banking and other payment services.

Controversy

Kenya Licensing 

Kenyan central bank Governor Patrick Njoroge disclosed on July 28, 2022, after the Monetary Policy Committee meeting, that Flutterwave and Chipper have not been granted a licence to operate in the country. The clarification of Patrick followed an initial ruling by a Kenyan High Court on July 6, 2022, which froze all assets and accounts of Flutterwave in the country.

Flutterwave, in an official response, disclosed that it submitted applications for licensing to the central bank of Kenya in 2019 but has not been granted one.

In February 2023, a Kenyan court released $51.9 million belonging to Flutterwave after the Asset Recovery Agency of Kenya withdrew its case against the startup.

Money Laundering 
In July 2022 a Kenyan High Court froze accounts held by Flutterwave holding over 6.2 billion of Kenyan shilling based upon allegations of that the funds were the proceeds of credit card fraud and money laundering after a request from Kenya's Assets Recovery Agency   The company has denied accusations of financial misconduct.

The Kenya's Assets Recovery Agency withdraw the allegation of money laundering and fraud against Flutterwave. In a court order cited by Bloomberg, the agency absorbed Flutterwave of any infringement.

Harassment
Flutterwave has been subject to multiple lawsuits and allegations of denying former employees stock rights as well as having a culture of bullying and harassment.  In a response, the company stated it has taken action against individuals within the company responsible for harassment.

Fraud 
On March 3, 2023, a Twitter user tweeted about a hack at Flutterwave. Two days later, on March 5, Flutterwave denied the TechPoint Africa report of a hack, stating that customers did not lose any funds. However, several sources told TechCabal that they lost funds and their accounts were frozen. The court documents seen by TechCabal included a petition by Flutterwave's legal counsel to the police, which was dated February 20, 2023.

See also 

Interswitch
PayPal
Stripe (company)
E-commerce payment system
List of online payment service providers
Payment service provider

References

External links
Official site

Financial services companies established in 2016
Financial technology companies of Nigeria